The Intel 80376, introduced January 16, 1989, was a variant of the Intel 80386SX intended for embedded systems.
It differed from the 80386 in not supporting real mode (the processor booted directly into 32-bit protected mode) and having no support for paging in the MMU. The 376 was available at 16 or 20 MHz clock rates.

This processor can perform up to 3.0 MIPS at 16 MHz speed.  It offers from 70 to 80 percent of the performance with 80386 at the same clock speed.  This processor has external 16-bit bus with internal 32-bit bus.  The Intel 82370 chipset which contains 8 DMA channels, 15 interrupts, 4 16-bit timer/counters, DRAM refresh controller, and wait-state generator which it is closely coupled with this processor, but it is software compatible to Intel 82380 chipset.  Both devices are packaged with 100-pin BQFP.  The 80376 and the 82370 version have also have 88-PGA and 132-PGA package as well respectfully.  The plastic version of 80376 were USD $99 and 82370 were USD $57 in quantities of 100 respectfully.

It was replaced with the much more successful 80386EX from 1994, and was finally discontinued on June 15, 2001.

References

 Intel 376 High Performance 32-bit Embedded Processor datasheet 

80376